The Audi A4 DTM is a 4-door touring car (DTM) constructed by the German car manufacturer Audi. It was first developed for use in the 2004 DTM season, replacing the Audi TT DTM at the end of the 2003 DTM season. Based on the Audi A4, it was continually improved over the course of six facelifts between 2004 and 2011. The Audi A4 DTM was succeeded by the Audi A5 DTM in 2012.

Comeback as a factory team
After the private Team Abt Audi TT-R was raced from 2000 to 2003, Audi re-entered the DTM series with a factory team since 1992. Audi's comeback resulted in a successful start and finish with titles for the driver, team, and manufacturer rating of the championship race.

Production A4 DTM Edition
To celebrate its first DTM championship title win in 2004, Audi released a production variant of the A4 called the DTM from 2005 to 2007. It featured an additional 20-horsepower over the standard model, sports-styled exterior features, and a new version of the quattro all-wheel-drive system.

Gallery

References

External links

A4 DTM
Deutsche Tourenwagen Masters cars